The FIS Alpine World Ski Championships 2007 were the 39th FIS Alpine World Ski Championships, held 2–18 February in Åre, Sweden. Åre previously hosted the world championships in 1954, and often hosts late season World Cup events.

The FIS awarded the 2007 event in 2002; other finalists were Lillehammer, Norway, and Val-d'Isère, France, which was later selected to host the 2009 championships.

These were the first world championships to use the "super-combined" format (one run each of downhill and slalom) for the combined event.  First run on the World Cup circuit in 2005 at Wengen, the "super-combi" format (SC) made its debut at the Winter Olympics in 2010.  The traditional combined format (K) consists of one downhill run and two slalom runs.

Venues
 The World Championships Arena was accessed via the "VM-8an," an 8-passenger hybrid lift installed in 2006.The races were held on the Gästrappet, Lundsrappet, Störtloppet and VM-Störtloppet slopes.
 The medal ceremonies were held at the Medal Plaza at Åre Torg.
 The opening ceremony was held at the Festival Arena, situated outside the Holiday Club Hotel by Lake Åre.

Course information

Opening ceremony
2 February 19:00

 The King of Sweden, Carl XVI Gustaf, officially opened the FIS Alpine World Ski Championships

Men's events

Men's downhill

10 February 12:30. Race postponed to 11 February 10:00 CET due to foggy weather conditions.

Men's super-G

Originally planned for 3 February 12:30; postponed to 5 February due to wind conditions.

Race was postponed for a second time, to 6 February 10:00 CET.

Men's giant slalom

Qualification: 12 February 10:00/13:30

Final: 14 February 10:00/13:00

Men's slalom

Qualification: 15 February 10:00/13:30

Final: 17 February 10:00/13:00

Men's super combined

8 February 12:30/16:00

Women's events

Women's downhill

11 February 12:30

Women's super-G

Originally planned for 4 February 12:30; postponed to 6 February due to wind conditions.

Women's giant slalom

13 February 17:00/20:00

Women's slalom

16 February 17:00/20:00

Women's super combined

9 February 12:30/16:00

Team event

Nations team event

18 February 10:00/13:00

This competition was part of the World Championships for the second time. Six athletes from each country, including at least two men and two women, compete in a total of four super-G and four slalom runs. Each country sends one athlete into each run, alternating between men and women. The placings of all eight competitions are added, and the country with the lowest number wins. If an athlete doesn't finish the run, gets disqualified or scores a time worse than 108% of the winning time, an extra penalty is incurred.  If an athlete doesn't start, an even greater penalty is incurred.

Medal table

Participating nations
60 nations participated: (number of athletes in parentheses)

References

 Are 2007.com – official site
 FIS-ski.com – results – 2007 World Championships – Åre, Sweden
 FIS-ski.com – results – World Championships
 Ski-db.com – results – 2007 Aare
 wm07.blogspot.com – a list of links related to the championships

 
FIS Alpine World Ski Championships
FIS Alpine World Ski Championships
2007
Alpine Skiing
Sport in Åre
Alpine skiing competitions in Sweden
February 2007 sports events in Europe